Bellaghy, in County Sligo in Ireland, is a border-town adjoined to Charlestown, County Mayo.

References

Towns and villages in County Sligo